The Canadian province of Alberta first required its residents to register their motor vehicles in 1906. Registrants provided their own licence plates for display until 1912, when the province began to issue plates. Only rear plates have been required since 1992.

List of plate issues

1912 to 1915
When the first plates were issued in Alberta, a number of materials were tried. 1912 and 1913 used porcelain enameled iron, and 1914 and 1915 used thin sheet metal with silkscreened number rolled over a wire frame. Serials issued started at 1 every year, and every year the registrant could request the same number as the previous year. The 1912 plate followed the design of other provinces, but 1913 to 1915 featured the Alberta shield and year on the left side. Registration expired December 31.

1916 to 1920
Starting with the 1916 issue, a heavier gauge of metal was used, and the text moved to the right side, saying ALTA, and the year. The 1918 plates were the first embossed plates, and 1920 had the first painted border.

1921 to 1924
The 1921 to 1924 issues each used several plate sizes, depending on the length of the serial. Hyphens were also used in serials for the first time.

1925 to 1936
The 1925 base was the first to feature the full province name. Six-digit serials were used for the first time in 1929.

1937 to 1951
In 1937, the licence year was changed to April 1 to March 31, and continued as such until 1984. The 1940 (expiring March 31, 1941) base was the first to feature a slogan, namely "Drive Safely". This slogan was used again on the 1941 (expiring March 31, 1942) base, before the 1942 (expiring March 31, 1943) base featured "Canada", the first and thus far only Alberta base to feature the country name. Due to metal conservation for World War II, the 1943 (expiring March 31, 1944) base was revalidated until March 31, 1945 with windshield stickers. Six-digit serials were issued on each base from 1947 through 1951.

1952 to 1953
The first Alberta licence plate that complied with these standards was issued four years beforehand, in 1952.

The 1952 base was also the first reflective base, with beaded white characters on a black background. Letters were used in passenger serials for the first time: five-character serials were used, with a single letter in the third and later the second position. The letter Q was not used, while the letters I and O were at a smaller size to prevent confusion with the numbers 1 and 0.

Passenger and dealer plates on this base were revalidated for 1953 with black-on-aluminum "53" tabs. Other vehicle types, however, received new plates for 1953, with dark blue characters on a white background.

1954 to 1972
Two-letter series were introduced in 1954, with each series initially followed by three digits. In 1960, the number of digits increased to four, with each series running from 0001 to 9000. From 1964 through 1972, only B, C, E, H, J, K, L, N, R, T, X and Z were used as the first letter, with four such letters allocated each year. The 1967 base commemorated the centennial of Canadian Confederation.

1973 to 1983
The 1973–74 base used the AB-12-34 serial format, with B, C, E, H, K and L used as the first letter. It was also the first base to feature the "Wild Rose Country" slogan, which remains in use today.

The 1975–84 base introduced the ABC-123 serial format, which provided many more combinations. However, only 15 letters were used at first (B, C, D, F, G, H, J, K, L, N, P, R, T, V and X), while others were later used only as the first letter (with some exceptions), and the overall order of issuance was not strictly alphabetical. Most plates on this base were manufactured in Alberta, but some were manufactured in Quebec and Nova Scotia using these provinces' serial dies.

1983 to present
The current white, red and blue base was introduced in late 1983. Monthly staggered registration was introduced at the same time, with the month of expiration determined by the first letter of the registrant's surname, and the plate expiring on the last day of the assigned month. Plates were originally manufactured from steel and were reflective; non-reflective plates were introduced in 1993 as a cost-saving measure, while the material changed to aluminum in 1999 due to a steel shortage at the plant where the plates were manufactured. Front and rear plates were required until 1991; only rear plates have been required ever since. Several serial dies have been used on this base, owing to different plate vendors.

The base originally used the ABC-123 serial format, starting at BBB-000. The letters I, O and Q were not used in this format, and A, E, U and Y were used only from 1997, beginning with the TGY series. After YZZ-999 was reached in 2003 (the 'Z' series were reserved for ATVs at the time), previously skipped series containing A, E, U and Y were issued, starting with the BAA series and ending with the TGU series in April 2009. These were followed by the 'Z' series that had not been issued on ATVs, including those containing A, E, U and Y. The 'A' and 'X' series were not issued due to their use on Handicapped and Motorcycle plates respectively.

Some three-letter series were skipped because they had offensive connotations. The BSE series was issued in 2004, but was largely recalled due to a mad cow disease crisis.

As the ABC-123 format neared exhaustion in the late 2000s, the Alberta government launched an initiative to design a new base, with an expected launch date of 2009. This project was eventually put on hold in favour of introducing an ABC-1234 format on the 1984 base. The new format started in June 2010 at BBB-0000, with the letters A, E, I, O, Q and U skipped.

In July 2019, the new Alberta logo was added to the base, with Wild Rose Country being kept. The issuance of the license plates with the new logo started with two out-of-order series: the last series with the old logo, CDT, was followed by CFT and then CFS. After that, regular sequence resumed: CDV through CFR, then (since CFS and CFT have already been issued) CFV and so forth.

As of 2021, month and year expiry stickers were no longer required, but can still be obtained and issued under certain circumstances.

Beginning in October 2021, Alberta began issuing passenger (class 3) license plates with HD 6700 reflective sheeting from 3M. The reflective series began at CKT-1800. This sheeting had been used on several small batches of Antique Auto, Motorcycle, and Veteran plates before being introduced to general issue plates. This is the first time reflective passenger plates had been issued since 1994. The changes also occurred to trailer plates at 6JP0-00, Class 2 commercial plates at 44-P000, and Class 1 commercial plates at the beginning of a new format, 0-AA000; this format would take effect after the exhaustion of the A-00000 to A-99999 series. Dealer plates had the new sheeting introduced at M83000.

Personalized plates
Alberta first issued personalized plates in 1985. As of 2018, over 80,000 such plates have been issued.

Personalized plates for private passenger vehicles can feature between one and seven characters, including letters, numbers, and spaces, while plates for motorcycles and veterans' vehicles can feature between one and five characters. Special characters, such as hyphens and exclamation marks, are not permitted. As in other jurisdictions, combinations may be rejected or withdrawn by the Registrar of Motor Vehicle Services if they are deemed offensive or confusing.

Personalized plates are issued in pairs, except for motorcycles. Only the rear plate is required to be displayed.

Specialty plates
A specially-designed Support Our Troops plate was introduced on July 22, 2014 to honor current and former members of the Canadian Armed Forces. The design features artwork in honour of the first four Alberta-based Canadian soldiers who died in Afghanistan in April 2002. The plate is available at registry agent locations in Alberta for a one-time $75 fee and a $9 registry agent service charge. For every plate purchased, $55 of the purchase price goes to the Support Our Troops Program managed by the Canadian Forces Morale and Welfare Services.

On November 19, 2018, two specially-designed Calgary Flames and Edmonton Oilers plates were introduced, with $55 of each $75 plate going to the Calgary Flames Foundation and the Edmonton Oilers Community Foundation. In the first two months of sales 4507 plates were sold (2750 Oilers plates and 1757 Flames plates), raising over $247,000 for the foundations.

Non-passenger plates

Previous plates

References

External links
Alberta Licence Plates 1912-Date All Types
Alberta licence plates 1969-present
Service Alberta - Vehicle Licence Plate and Registration

1912 establishments in Alberta
Alberta
Transport in Alberta
Alberta-related lists